The Nation of Brunei, the Abode of Peace and the United Kingdom of Great Britain and Northern Ireland have formal diplomatic relations. Brunei has a high commission in London, and United Kingdom has a high commission in Bandar Seri Begawan. Both Countries are members of the Commonwealth and share history and have a friendly and strong relationship, dating back to the 19th century.

Education relations 
In 2014, there were 1,700–2,000 Bruneians studying in the United Kingdom and there is a connection between both countries universities, with the United Kingdom being a popular choice for many Bruneians study in.

Economic relations 
In economics, the United Kingdom and Brunei have a bilateral trading relationship. The exports from Brunei to the United Kingdom total about £100 million. The United Kingdom is also actively engaged in encouraging small businesses from Brunei to take their products into international markets. The United Kingdom has also expressed interest in joining the Comprehensive and Progressive Agreement for Trans-Pacific Partnership, which Brunei is already a part of, which would further enhance and build upon the trading relationship amongst the United Kingdom and Brunei.

Security relations 
There are very strong defence relations that date back before the independence of Brunei from the British Empire. The United Kingdom operates a garrison in Brunei, which has British Army and Royal Air Force personnel, which cooperate and help regularly with the Royal Brunei Armed Forces. This defence cooperation includes equipment sales, training, military and intelligence exchanges and assistance and the sharing of experiences. The Sultan of Brunei himself is an honorary Air Chief Marshal of the Royal Air Force and an honorary Admiral of the Royal Navy.

See also
 Politics of Brunei

References 

 
United Kingdom
Bilateral relations of the United Kingdom
Relations of colonizer and former colony